Víctor Luis Fernando Roldán Campos (24 July 1930 – 22 June 2019) was a Chilean football defender who played for Chile in the 1950 FIFA World Cup. He also played for Club Deportivo Universidad Católica.

References

External links
FIFA profile

1930 births
2019 deaths
Chilean footballers
Chile international footballers
Association football defenders
Club Deportivo Universidad Católica footballers
1950 FIFA World Cup players